,, was the former Jewish quarter of the city of Rhodes, Greece. The quarter was inhabited by Sephardic, Ladino-speaking Jews.

History
Although there has been a Jewish presence of some sort on the island of Rhodes for nearly 2,000 years, the inhabitants of La Juderia did not arrive until the 16th century, after they were expelled from Spain. The Jews of Rhodes prospered until the persecutions of Italian Fascism began in the 1930s, and at its peak the population of the Jewish quarter was more than 4,000.

Geography and features
La Juderia is located in the eastern part of the Old City of Rhodes, near a pier used by cruise ships. It is primarily centered on the Dossiadou Street where the Kahal Shalom Synagogue, the lone remaining Jewish house of worship on the island of the six that once stood, is located, along with the Jewish Museum of Rhodes. Other features in the quarter include the Square of the Martyred Jews, which pays tribute to the Jews of Rhodes who were murdered in the Holocaust, located near the heart of the neighborhood, the Alliance Israélite Universelle school, the former site of the Kahal Grande Synagogue, and a number of plaques throughout the quarter in Ladino, Hebrew and Italian. Outside the Juderia is the Jewish cemetery of Rhodes, which dates from the 16th century and is one of the best preserved in Europe.

References
Rhodes Jewish Museum
The Virtual Jewish History Tour: Greece

External links
Jewish Community of Rhodes
 The complete guide to the Jewish Quarter of Rhodes

Jewish Rhodian history
Sephardi Jewish culture in Greece
Historic Jewish communities in Europe